Henry Thurscross was Archdeacon of Cleveland from 1619 to 1635.

Thurcross was educated at Magdalen College, Oxford.  He held livings at Catterick, Winston, Langton, Stokesley and Kirkby Moorside.

References

17th-century English Anglican priests
Alumni of Magdalen College, Oxford
Archdeacons of Cleveland
1635 deaths